List of presidents of the Legislative Council of Barbados.

This position was succeeded by the President of the Senate of Barbados.

Sources
  Official website of the Parliament of Barbados

See also
 List of current presidents of assembly

Colonial government in Barbados
Politics of Barbados
Barbados, Legislative Council
Legislative Council Presidents